Asela Jayakody (20 April 1971 – 27 November 2011 as අසේල ජයකොඩි) [Sinhala]) was an actor in Sri Lankan cinema, stage drama and television. One of highly versatile actors, Jayakody acted several critically acclaimed films such as Gamani and Salelu Warama.

He died on 27 November 2011 by an accident in Welisara at the age of 40.

Personal life
He was born on 20 April 1971 in Colombo as the youngest of the family. His father, Wilfred Jayakody was a popular artist. His mother was Clera Bridget Jayakody (Née Senevirathne). He has three elder brothers - Upali, Premalal and Wasantha, and one elder sister, Kumari. He completed his education from Karunaratne Buddhist School, Mattumagala. At the time of his death, he was a father of two children: daughter Rishni Kaveesha and son Binura Jayakody.

Acting career
Jayakody started his drama career since school times. In 1998, along with another fellow actor Gihan Fernando, he went to a workshop conducted by Jayalal Rohana. Then, both were lucky to act in the stage drama, Bhoothawesha. He played vital roles in many television serials such as Synthetic Dreams, Romeo and Juliet Story, Fantasy Avenue, Sapiriwara, Sisila Ima, Sathkulu Pawwa, Gajamuthu, Ithin Eta Passe and Holman Bottuwa.

Jayakody started his film career with Vasantha Obeysekera's 2002 film Salelu Warama. Then he acted more than 10 films until his death in 2011. His most popular cinema acting came through films Salelu Warama, Gamani and Ran Kevita 2.

Television serials

 Arundathi
 Bath Amma
 Dadu Kete
 Deveni Athmaya
 Dhawala Yamaya
 Fantasy Avenue
 Gajamuthu
 Gini Weluma 
 Hada Pudasuna 
 Holman Bottuwa
 Ithin Eta Passe
 Kaha Ira Pamula
 Katu Kurullo 
 Kethumathi Neyo 
 Pini Bindu 
 Rathi Virathi 
 Romeo and Juliet Story
 Sandagira 
 Sandali Saha Radika 
 Sapirivara
 Sara
 Sathkulu Pawwa
 Sihina Aran Enna
 Siri Sirimal
 Sisila Ima
 Star Sri Lanka Histhanak
 Synthetic Dreams
 Wali Mankada

Death
On of 27 November 2011 at about 4 am, his car was parked along the Colombo –Negombo road by facing Negombo and after having had some dealings. After it, he with a friend had tried to enter the vehicle to go to his residence in Nagoda, Kandana. At that moment, a speeding vehicle had knocked both of them, where the vehicle had fled. He was rushed to the Ragama Hospital with serious injuries where he died before admitting to the hospital. His friend however survived with fatal injuries and transferred to The Colombo National Hospital for further treatments.

His funeral took place on 30 November 2011, Wednesday afternoon at the Kandana Nagoda St. John Baptist burial grounds.

Filmography
 No. denotes the Number of Sri Lankan film in the Sri Lankan cinema.

Raigam Tele'es Awards

|-
|| 2008 ||| Jury Appreciation Award || Acting ||

References

External links
Visiting celebrities add spice to Sri Lankan I-Day celebrations
Memories of Sri lanken Drama Actor Asela Jayakody's Funeral
Twenty teledramas:Tribute to writers

Sri Lankan male film actors
Sinhalese male actors
1971 births
2011 deaths
Road incident deaths in Sri Lanka